Discovery Community College is a private college in Campbell River, British Columbia, Canada, established in 1996.

External links 
 Discovery Community College Official Website
 PCTIA registered programs

Colleges in British Columbia
Campbell River, British Columbia
Educational institutions established in 1996
1996 establishments in British Columbia